The siege of Delhi (8–19 October 1804) was conducted by the Maratha leader Maharaja Yashwantrao Holkar against the forces of the British East India Company, who were assisting the Mughals in defending Delhi during the Second Anglo-Maratha War. Holkar's main political objective was to bring the Mughal emperor under his control and thus with force of 60,000 cavalry and 15,000 infantry, Holkar confronted the British commanders Lt. Col.s Ochterlony and Burn who were in charge at Delhi. Ochterlony and Burn defied Holkar's attack with great determination where "The important gates - Ajmeri Gate, Kashmiri Gate, and Lahori Gate - saw stiff fighting." Holkar abandoned the siege after reinforcements led by Gerard Lake arrived on 18 October.

References

Mehta, J. L. Advanced Studies in the history of modern India 1707-1813

Conflicts in 1804
Delhi 1804
1804 in India
Delhi 1804
Delhi 1804
Delhi 1804
19th century in Delhi
Military history of Delhi
October 1804 events